Bugarama is a commune of Rumonge Province in Burundi.

See also 

 Communes of Burundi

References 

Communes of Burundi
Rumonge Province